Tomorrow X Together (Tomorrow by Together, stylized TOMORROW X TOGETHER), commonly known as TXT, is a South Korean boy band formed by Big Hit Entertainment, now known as Big Hit Music. The group consists of five members: Yeonjun, Soobin, Beomgyu, Taehyun, and HueningKai.

They debuted on March 4, 2019, with the extended play (EP) The Dream Chapter: Star. The EP debuted and peaked at number one on the Gaon Album Chart and Billboard World Albums Chart and entered the US Billboard 200 at number 140, the highest-charting debut album by any male K-pop group at the time. Its lead single "Crown" debuted at number one on the Billboard World Digital Songs chart. The group also topped the Billboard Emerging Artists chart. TXT was the first Korean act to perform at Lollapalooza one of the biggest music festivals in the US.

The group's early commercial success earned them several new artist awards, including Rookie of the Year at the 34th Golden Disc Awards and the 2019 Melon Music Awards, New Artist of the Year at the 9th Gaon Chart Music Awards and Best New Male Artist at the 2019 Mnet Asian Music Awards.

Name 
TXT is an acronym for Tomorrow X Together. According to their website, their name refers to five individuals who "come together under one dream in hopes of building a better tomorrow".

In their first interview with MBC's Section TV in 2019, the group stated that they prefer to be called "Tomorrow X Together" over "TXT".

History

Pre-debut activities 
Plans for a second boy group from Big Hit Entertainment were announced by founder Bang Si-hyuk as early as 2017, and a debut date for early 2019 was set in November 2018. TXT was officially revealed on January 10, 2019. Over the next ten days, videos depicting each member, dubbed "introduction films," were released on YouTube.

2019: Debut and The Dream Chapter: Magic 
In 2019, six years after BTS made their debut, TXT was the first boy band since BTS to be introduced by Big Hit Entertainment. The group's debut broadcast aired on Mnet and its YouTube page, announced alongside the band's debut extended play (EP), The Dream Chapter: Star, which was released on March 4, 2019. Their debut showcase was held at the Yes24 Live Hall on March 5. Following the release of the EP, the music video of the album's lead single, "Crown" garnered 14.5 million views on YouTube, breaking the record for the most viewed K-pop debut music video within 24 hours for a boy group and the most liked K-pop debut music video, with 2.3 million likes in 24 hours. The album debuted atop the Gaon Album Chart and Billboard World Albums Chart, while "Crown" debuted at number one on the Billboard World Digital Songs chart. The group debuted at number one on the Billboard Emerging Artists and at number 140 on the Billboard 200 chart, making them the fastest to appear in these charts (they were the second fastest K-pop group to appear in the Billboard Emerging Artists) and highest-charting debut album by any male K-pop group. The album also ranked at number three on Oricon's Weekly Album Chart. Additionally, it went on to top the Gaon Monthly Album Chart for the month of March. TXT's first music show performance aired on March 7, 2019, on Mnet's M Countdown. They earned their first music show win on SBS MTV's The Show with "Crown", just after one week after their debut, followed by wins on M Countdown and Show Champion. "Crown" featured on GQs Decade-end list of "game-changers from a decade of K-pop" for the year 2019, with GQ writing, "The bright, effervescent pop of TXT who, [...] are in their own element as they playfully explore teenage growing pains."

On April 9, 2019, TXT announced their first-ever overseas tour, a six-show debut showcase in six American cities—New York City, Chicago, Los Angeles, Dallas, Orlando, and Atlanta—over the course of two weeks, from May 9 to 24. Tickets to all shows sold out in less than 24 hours. Following their showcase in May, TXT performed at the 2019 iHeartRadio Wango Tango music concert at Dignity Health Sports Park in Los Angeles on June 1.

On June 11, it was announced that TXT would be the first artist to join the new platform Weverse.

On June 20, the group announced that they would be performing in two of Japan's largest fashion festivals, Kansai Collection's Autumn/Winter 2019 runway show on August 27, followed by the Tokyo Girls Collection's Autumn/Winter 2019 show on September 7, making TXT the first Korean artist to perform at both shows in the same season. On July 6, TXT performed at the KCON 2019 NY music festival at Madison Square Garden, New York, in front of 55,000 spectators. Later that month, TXT received their first MTV Video Music Award nomination in the category of "Best K-pop".

On August 8, 2019, Big Hit Entertainment announced that plans to release a new album in August would be postponed to September due to Soobin's infectious conjunctivitis diagnosis and Yeonjun's back pain. On August 20, Big Hit Entertainment revealed members Taehyun and HueningKai had also been diagnosed with conjunctivitis, thus pushing the release date for the new album back from September to October.

On October 21, 2019, TXT finally released their first studio album, The Dream Chapter: Magic, with "9 and Three Quarters (Run Away)" as lead single. Musically, the album incorporated a variety of music genres, including R&B, tropical house, acoustic pop and hip hop. The album debuted atop the Gaon Album Chart, surpassing 124,000 sales in its first week. This marked the group's second chart-topping album following their debut EP. The album debuted at number three on Billboards World Albums Chart and at number six on the Billboard Heatseekers Album chart. A total of four tracks from the album entered the Billboard World Digital Songs chart, with the lead single debuting at number two. Billboard and Dazed both later named “9 and Three Quarters (Run Away)" one of the best K-pop songs of the year.

TXT's commercial success in their early months earned them several rookie awards at major Korean year-end music award shows, including the Asia Artist Awards, Melon Music Awards, Mnet Asian Music Awards, Golden Disc Awards, Gaon Chart Music Awards and Seoul Music Awards.

2020: Japanese debut, The Dream Chapter: Eternity, and Minisode1: Blue Hour
On January 15, 2020, TXT made their Japanese debut with the single "Magic Hour", which includes the Japanese versions of their songs "Run Away", "Crown", and "Angel or Devil". The single album debuted at number one on the Oricon Daily Chart and at number two on the Oricon Weekly Singles Chart. On January 19, the group's Japanese television debut was announced with their first appearance on TV Asahi's Music Station. They performed the Japanese version of "Run Away" on January 24, the first Korean artist to perform on the show in 2020. "Magic Hour" was certified gold by the Recording Industry Association of Japan (RIAJ) for selling 100,000 units.

On April 28, Big Hit Entertainment set the release date of TXT's second EP, The Dream Chapter: Eternity, for May 18, to be led by the single "Can't You See Me?". The album sold over 181,000 units in its first week and entered the Gaon Album Chart at number two. It debuted at number one on the Oricon Albums Chart, becoming the band's first chart-topper in Japan. In July 2020, the album received a platinum certification from the Korea Music Content Association (KMCA) for 250,000 album shipments, giving TXT their first certification in the country since their debut. Two months later, The Dream Chapter: Star and The Dream Chapter: Magic were also certified platinum by the KMCA.

On July 20, 2020, it was announced that Soobin would be the new MC of KBS2's Music Bank for one year, along with Oh My Girl's Arin. His first broadcast as MC was on July 24, 2020, and his final on October 1, 2021. On August 19, 2020, TXT released their second Japanese single "Drama". The single album included Japanese versions of "Drama" and "Can't You See Me?", as well as their first original Japanese song, "Everlasting Shine". "Everlasting Shine" served as the twelfth opening theme of the anime Black Clover, which began airing on September 1. "Drama" debuted and peaked at number three on the Japanese Oricon Singles Chart and was certified gold by the RIAJ.

TXT released their third EP Minisode1: Blue Hour with the lead single "Blue Hour" on October 26. The album debuted at number three on the Gaon Album Chart, selling over 300,000 copies in its first week. In the United States, the EP debuted at number 25 on the Billboard 200, the top-selling album of the week. It also claimed the top spot on the Billboard World Albums chart, with TXT again topping the Emerging Artists chart. The EP also entered the Oricon Albums Chart at number one, becoming their second chart-topper in Japan. It was certified platinum by the KMCA. TXT released an original soundtrack titled "Your Light" for the JTBC teen-drama Live On on November 24, and member Yeonjun also made a cameo in the last episode.

2021: Still Dreaming, The Chaos Chapter, and Chaotic Wonderland
Their debut Japanese studio album Still Dreaming was released on January 20, 2021. The album included the original Japanese song "Force", which served as the opening theme for the second season of anime World Trigger. Still Dreaming debuted and peaked at number one on the Japanese Oricon Albums Chart and was certified gold by the RIAJ. The album charted at number 173 on the Billboard 200, making TXT the second Korean band in history to chart an album in Japanese on the US albums chart. In April 2021, Minisode1: Blue Hour was certified double platinum by the KMCA, indicating 500,000 shipments.

On April 22, 2021, Big Hit Music announced that TXT would make a comeback at the end of May. The group released their second studio album, The Chaos Chapter: Freeze on May 31 with lead single "0X1=Lovesong (I Know I Love You)", featuring Seori. On May 7, it was announced that the album pre-orders had surpassed 520,000 copies in six days. On May 31, before the official release of the album, pre-orders increased to over 700,000 copies, doubling from their last release. The Chaos Chapter: Freeze debuted at number five on the Billboard 200, becoming the band's highest-charting album in the United States and the top-selling album that week. The album peaked at number one on the Oricon Albums Chart, becoming TXT's fourth consecutive chart-topper in Japan. On May 24, the band released the original soundtrack "Love Sight" for the tvN drama Doom At Your Service. On June 25, TXT released a remix of "0X1=Lovesong (I Know I Love You)" featuring pH-1, Woodie Gochild and Seori. In July, The Chaos Chapter: Freeze was certified Gold by the RIAJ, TXT's first Korean release to be certified in Japan. In August, the album was certified triple platinum by the KMCA, indicating 750,000 shipments.

The band released The Chaos Chapter: Fight or Escape, a repackaged version of The Chaos Chapter: Freeze, with lead single "Loser=Lover" on August 17, 2021. On October 3, the group held their first full-length concert, entitled ACT:BOY. The concert ran for 150 minutes, featured 25 songs, and was streamed through online platform VenewLive to fans in 126 countries. On October 5, it was announced that each member would serve as guest DJs on KBS Cool FM's Kiss the Radio from October 25 to 31, hosting "Tomorrow x Together week" to "showcase their unique charms" following previous DJ Young K's military enlistment.

TXT released their first Japanese EP, Chaotic Wonderland, on November 10, 2021. It contained Japanese versions of "0X1=Lovesong (I Know I Love You)" featuring Ikuta Lilas, vocalist of Japanese musical duo Yoasobi, and "MOA Diary (Dubaddu Wari Wari)", along with original Japanese song "Ito" and the group's first original English song "Magic". "Ito", composed by Japanese rock band Greeeen, served as the theme song for Japanese drama Spiral Labyrinth – DNA Forensic Investigation[ja], adapted from the manga of the same name.

On November 24, 2021, TXT was awarded the 2021 Men of the Year Pop Icon Award by GQ Japan. The group also featured on the cover of Euphoria magazine, where they spoke to Aedan Juvet about being named the "it group" of K-pop's fourth generation.

2022: Minisode 2: Thursday's Child and first world tour
On March 14, 2022, it was announced that Yeonjun would be the new MC of SBS's Inkigayo alongside Roh Jeong-eui and Seo Bum-june.

On March 23, 2022, TXT became the first male K-pop artist to enter Billboards Song Breaker Chart.

They released their fourth EP, Minisode 2: Thursday's Child, and its lead single "Good Boy Gone Bad" on May 9, 2022.
On April 20, 2022, pre-orders surpassed 810,000 copies, six days after the announcement. To support the EP, the group embarked on their first world tour, Act: Lovesick, beginning on July 2. On July 22, 2022, the group released an English single "Valley of Lies" featuring Puerto Rican rapper Iann Dior.  On July 30, 2022, TXT became the first K-pop act to perform at Lollapalooza. 

On August 31, TXT's third Japanese single, "Good Boy Gone Bad" was released. It contained the Japanese version of "Good Boy Gone Bad" and two original Japanese song, "Hitori no Yoru" and "Kimi janai dareka no (Ring)". "Ring" was used as the theme song for Abema's show Heart Signal Japan, a remake of the Korean reality show Heart Signal.

2023–present: The Name Chapter
The band released their fifth EP, The Name Chapter: Temptation, on January 27, 2023. On February 22, the group made available "Goodbye now" which served as the original soundtrack for the Webtoon Love Revolution.

Members 
Soobin – leader
Yeonjun
Beomgyu
Taehyun
HueningKai

Artistry

Musical style and lyrical themes
According to Rolling Stone, Tomorrow X Together's music "dabbles in disco, shoegaze, indie rock, and pop" and discusses "personal stories about the growing pains that come along with being a teenager". NME described the group's discography as mostly "bright, breezy and blissfully free from life’s worries" and "focusing more on fantasy and fun". The members have expressed their desire to be more involved in songwriting.

Endorsements
In May 2019, TXT was announced as the new ambassadors for Korean skin care brand It's Skin. In December 2019, TXT was announced as exclusive models for Korean student uniform brand Skoolooks' 2020 collections. In February 2021, TXT was selected as "main characters" in TikTok's #BeMyValentine global campaign to celebrate Valentine's Day. In March 2021, the group was announced as models for the Japanese audio brand GLIDiC. In July 2021, the group was revealed to be the newest brand ambassadors of Philippine telecommunications giant Smart Communications for its "Build Your Own Giga" campaign. In August 2021, TXT was selected as models for Korean beauty brand 4OIN. In May 2022, the group was announced as the global ambassadors for Korean skin care brand Ma:nyo factory. In February 2023, TXT was appointed as the first global ambassador for the personal care brand KUNDAL.  They were selected as the new global ambassadors for Korean beauty brand Clio in the same month.

Discography

Korean-language studio albums
 The Dream Chapter: Magic (2019)
 The Chaos Chapter: Freeze (2021)

Japanese-language studio albums
 Still Dreaming (2021)

Filmography

Television

Online shows

Radio shows

Concerts and tours

Headlining tours
 Act: Lovesick (2022)
 Act: Sweet Mirage (2023)

Concerts

Concert participation
 2021 New Year's Eve Live presented by Weverse
 2022 Weverse Con [New Era]
 2022 Lollapalooza
 2022 Summer Sonic Festival
 2023 Dick Clark’s New Year’s Rockin’ Eve

Awards and nominations

References

External links 

 

 
2019 establishments in South Korea
K-pop music groups
Musical groups from Seoul
Musical groups established in 2019
Hybe Corporation artists
Republic Records artists
Universal Music Japan artists
Universal Music Group artists
South Korean boy bands
MAMA Award winners
Melon Music Award winners
Japanese-language singers of South Korea
English-language singers from South Korea